New Zealand first sent an independent team to the Olympics in 1920. Prior to this, at the 1908 and 1912 Summer Olympics, New Zealand and Australian athletes competed together in a combined Australasia team. New Zealand has also participated in most Winter Olympic Games since 1952, missing only the 1956 and 1964 Games.

The New Zealand Olympic Committee (NZOC) is the National Olympic Committee for New Zealand. The NZOC was founded in 1911, and recognised by the IOC in 1919.

New Zealand athletes have won a total of 143 medals, with 137 won at the Summer Games and six at the Winter Games. The most successful sports has been rowing with 29 medals, with athletics second with 26 medals. Prior to the 2022 Winter Olympics, the 140 medals won by New Zealand put the country at number 32 on the all-time Olympic Games medal table for total number of medals and number 24 when weighted by medal type.

Following the 2020 Summer Olympics, 1519 competitors had represented New Zealand at Olympic Games. Harry Kerr is considered the first Kiwi Olympian and Adrian Blincoe the 1000th. On 11 June 2009 it was reported that of the 1111 Olympians to that date, 114 were deceased and the whereabouts of 21 were unknown.
By 25 June 2009 only 9 Olympians had not been located. There are no living Kiwi Olympians from before the 1948 Olympics in London.

New Zealand at the Summer Games
The first person from New Zealand to perform at the Olympic Games was Victor Lindberg, who competed for the Osborne Swimming Club of Great Britain which won the Water Polo at the 1900 Summer Olympics.

Due to its location in the South Pacific and distance from the early Olympic host cities in Europe and North America, New Zealanders needed to endure long sea voyages to participate. New Zealand sent its first independent team to the VII Olympiad in 1920, comprising two runners, a rower, and a 15-year-old swimmer. Prior to 1920, three New Zealanders won medals competing for Australasian teams in 1908 and 1912. Since the advent of international jet air travel in the 1950s, and the greater number of Olympic sports, the size of New Zealand Olympic teams has increased substantially.

New Zealand, as with other Southern Hemisphere countries, has had the disadvantage of needing to peak to compete in summer sports which are held during their winter months. Only three Olympics have ever been held in the Southern Hemisphere, the 1956 Summer Olympics in Melbourne, the 2000 Summer Olympics in Sydney, and the 2016 Summer Olympics in Rio de Janeiro.

New Zealand's participation in the 1976 Games was controversial, and led to a boycott of the Games by most African countries, who protested against sporting contacts between the All Blacks and apartheid South Africa.

New Zealand at the Winter Games 

New Zealand has had a much smaller participation in the Winter Olympics, owing to its oceanic climate and Southern Hemisphere location requiring athletes to peak in the middle of the New Zealand summer. The nation did not assemble their first Winter Olympic team until 1952. In 1988 the team included bobsleighers; the first entry in a winter sport other than alpine skiing.

In 1992, Annelise Coberger of New Zealand became the first person from the Southern Hemisphere to win a medal at the Winter Olympics when she won silver in the slalom at Albertville in France.

In 2018, Zoi Sadowski-Synnott won New Zealand's second Winter Olympic medal in the inaugural big air snowboarding competition in Pyeongchang, South Korea, winning bronze. Later in the same day, 16 year old Nico Porteous won New Zealand's third Winter Olympic medal in the men's ski halfpipe, also taking bronze.

Four years later in 2022, Zoi Sadowski-Synnott also won New Zealand's first ever Winter Olympics gold medal, in the women's slopestyle. Nico Porteous later won New Zealand’s second ever Winter Olympics gold medal, again in the men’s ski half pipe.

Participation

Timeline of participation

Medal tables

Medals by Summer Games

Medals by Winter Games

Medals by Summer Sport

Medals by Winter Sport

Summary by sport

Sailing

See also
 List of flag bearers for New Zealand at the Olympics
 List of New Zealand Olympic medallists
 :Category:Olympic competitors for New Zealand
 New Zealand Olympic Committee
 New Zealand at the Paralympics

References

External links
 
 
 
Athletics in the 1966 Encyclopaedia of New Zealand has a paragraph on each Olympiad and Empire Games to 1964 
The Olympics (NZHistory.net.nz) 
The Joseph Romanos list of our best Olympians 
Medal Count for NZ at DatabaseOlympics.com (total of 78 not complete) 
New Zealand Olympic Committee's Museum App